Towers in the park is a morphology of modernist high rise apartment buildings characterized by a high-rise building (a "slab") surrounded by a swath of landscaped land. Thus, the tower does not directly front the street. It was popular in North American and European cities in the 1960s and into the 1970s, especially for public housing. The towers themselves are typically simple, brick-clad high-rise buildings with rectangular footprints and little ornamentation other than repeating series of balconies for each apartment. However, some apartment buildings from this era use less conventional designs in the "tower in the park" format.

History
Le Corbusier pioneered the "tower in a park" morphology in his unrealized 1923 Ville Contemporaine. Responding to the squalid conditions of cities in the 1920s, Le Corbusier proposed razing the old cities and replacing them with new, clean, hyper-rationalist layouts employing the "tower in a park" morphology. The skyscrapers were intended to house the new city's three million residents on only 5% of the land. By placing the buildings near the center of the block, there is room for parking, lawns, trees, and other landscaping elements. Le Corbusier further employed the morphology in his 1930 plan for Paris, the Ville Radieuse (also unrealized). Owing to the wide diffusion and influence of these two plans and their ideas post–World War II, especially the latter, the "tower in the park" morphology spread throughout Europe and North America.

Criticism and current state 
By the early 1970s, opposition to this style of towers mounted, with many, including urban planners, now referring to them as "ghettos". Neighbourhoods like St. James Town were originally designed to house young "swinging single" middle class residents, but the apartments lacked appeal and the area quickly became much poorer.

Some public housing projects taking the form of towers in a park in the United States, most notably Pruitt-Igoe in St. Louis, Missouri, were demolished because of deteriorating conditions. This was principally caused by the worsening economic circumstances of residents and an overall disinvestment in public housing. By the mid 2000s, green space surrounding some of the towers began being developed with new towers in an effort to increase density.

See also
Some examples of the tower in a park morphology are below:
Vladeck Houses in New York City, New York
Morrisania, Bronx in New York City, New York
Pruitt–Igoe in St. Louis, Missouri (demolished)
Red Road Flats in Glasgow, Scotland (demolished)
Broadwater Farm in London, England
Co-op City, Bronx in New York City, New York
 Ballymun Flats in Dublin, Ireland (demolished)
 Bishan-Ang Mo Kio Park in Singapore
 Parkchester in New York City, New York
 Sandburg Halls in Milwaukee, Wisconsin
 Starrett City, Brooklyn in New York City, New York
 Stuyvesant Town–Peter Cooper Village in New York City, New York
 Unité d'habitation in Marseille, France

References

Modernist architecture